Middleton Junction railway station was on the Caldervale Line, from 1842 until closure on 3 January 1966. It was located at Lane End in Chadderton, a former hamlet which later adopted the place-name Middleton Junction after the area expanded after the opening of the railway. The station was originally called Oldham Junction but by August 1842 it was known as Middleton Station, changing its name to Middleton Junction some ten years later.

The line was notable for a stretch of steep 1 in 27 gradient called the Werneth Incline. On 12 August 1914 a goods and coal depot was opened at Chadderton. The line from Chadderton Junction to Oldham was closed to passengers in 1958 and completely on 7 January 1963 but the Chadderton goods and coal depot remained open and in use until 1988 (the track was eventually lifted in September 1991).

A branch line from Middleton Junction to Middleton was opened on 5 January 1857, closing to passengers on 7 September 1964 (as a result of the Beeching Axe) and completely on 11 October 1965.

References

The Manchester and Leeds Railway by Martin Bairstow
Marshall, J. (1981) Forgotten Railways: North-West England, David & Charles (Publishers) Ltd, Newton Abbott. 

Disused railway stations in the Metropolitan Borough of Oldham
Former Lancashire and Yorkshire Railway stations
Railway stations in Great Britain opened in 1842
Railway stations in Great Britain closed in 1966
Beeching closures in England
Buildings and structures in Chadderton
1842 establishments in England
1966 disestablishments in England